Kenneth Leo Retzer (April 30, 1934 – May 17, 2020) was an American professional baseball player. He was a catcher in Major League Baseball for the Washington Senators from 1961 to 1964, appearing in 237 games played.

Born in Wood River, Illinois, Retzer attended Jefferson City Community College and the University of Central Missouri. He was signed by the Cleveland Indians before the 1954 season, but played his entire major league career for the Senators after Washington acquired him in a September 1961 trade. In 1962, Retzer batted a career-best .285 with 97 hits and eight home runs, and was a serious candidate for Rookie of the Year honors. On Opening Day in 1963, Retzer caught the ceremonial first pitch thrown by President John F. Kennedy. Retzer was also known for catching the first pitch of MLB's 100,000th game on September 6, 1963; the ball was presented to and preserved in the Baseball Hall of Fame. 

He finished his career with a lifetime batting mark of .264, 182 hits, 14 homers, 72 runs batted in and 65 runs scored. He had a lifetime fielding percentage of .983 and threw out 48 of 126 baserunners making stolen base attempts, a rate of 38.1 percent.

Retzer's 13-season pro career ended in 1967. Retzer died at his home on May 17, 2020.

References

External links

Baseball Almanac

1934 births
2020 deaths
Baseball players from Illinois
Denver Bears players
Fargo-Moorhead Twins players
Indianapolis Indians players
Major League Baseball catchers
Mobile Bears players
Oklahoma City 89ers players
People from Wood River, Illinois
Portland Beavers players
Reading Indians players
Rochester Red Wings players
San Diego Padres (minor league) players
Tifton Indians players
Toronto Maple Leafs (International League) players
Washington Senators (1961–1971) players
American expatriate baseball players in Colombia